James Cross Giblin (July 8, 1933 – April 10, 2016) was an American children's author and editor. He won a Golden Kite Award.

Life 
Giblin was born on July 8, 1933, in Cleveland, and was raised in Painesville, OH. He graduated from Western Reserve University with a BA in drama, and went on to receive a master's in playwriting from Columbia University. After a brief period as an actor, he went to work in publishing, first for Criterion Books, later for Lothrop, Lee & Shepard; and Seabury Press. While at Seabury he founded a children's imprint, Clarion Books, which was later acquired by Houghton Mifflin. At Clarion he edited such notable children's book authors as Eileen Christelow, the author and illustrator of the "Five Little Monkeys" series; and Mary Downing Hahn, who wrote ghost stories for middle graders.

Works 
 Chimney Sweeps: Yesterday and Today, Thomas Y. Crowell, 1982, illustrated by Margaret Tomes (winner of an American Book Award)
 Walls: Defenses Throughout History, Little, Brown & Co., 1984
 Milk: The Fight for Purity, Thomas Y. Crowell, 1986
 From Hand to Mouth: or, How We Invented Knives, Forks, Spoons, and Chopsticks, and the Table Manners to Go With Them, HarperCollins Publishers, 1987
 Let There Be Light: A Book About Windows, Thomas Y. Crowell, 1988
 Be Seated: A Book About Chairs, HarperCollins Children's Books, 1993
 When Plague Strikes: The Black Death, Smallpox, AIDS, HarperCollins Publishers, 1995, illustrated by David Frampton
 Charles A. Lindbergh: A Human Hero, Clarion Books, 1997 
 The Life and Death of Adolf Hitler, Clarion Books, 2002 (Winner of the Robert F. Silbert Medal from the American Library Association)
 Good Brother, Bad Brother: The Story of Edwin Booth and John Wilkes Booth, Clarion Books, 2005
 The Rise and Fall of Senator Joe McCarthy, Clarion Books, 2009

References 

1933 births
2016 deaths
People from Cleveland